Jadar may refer to:

 Jadar (Drina), a river in western Serbia, tributary to the Drina
 , a river in eastern Republika Srpska, Bosnia and Herzegovina, tributary to the Drinjača
  (Cold Jadar), a river in eastern Republika Srpska, Bosnia and Herzegovina, tributary to Jadar (Drinjača)
 Jadar (Serbia), a region surrounding the Jadar river in western Serbia
 Jadar (mineral), sodium lithium boron silicate hydroxide
Jadar, Yemen
 Jæren, a flatland area central to Rogaland, Norway